Armchair Mystery Theatre is a 60-minute UK television anthology mystery series. Thirty-four episodes aired from 1960–1965. It was hosted by Donald Pleasence and produced by Leonard White. It was a spin-off from the successful Armchair Theatre  series.

Guest stars included Edward Woodward, Cyril Cusack, Sam Wanamaker, Ron Moody, Tom Bell, Denholm Elliott, and Sybil Thorndike.

References

External links

1960 British television series debuts
1965 British television series endings
Television shows produced by ABC Weekend TV